Tara Megan Donnelly (born 25 December 1998) is a Manx artistic gymnast.  She is the 2021 Northern European champion on floor exercise.  She previously represented Ireland in international competition.

Early life 
Donnelly was born on the Isle of Man in 1998.  She has a sister, Chloe, who is also a gymnast.  She is a dual citizen of Ireland and Great Britain.

Gymnastics career

2013 
Donnelly competed at the British Championships where she finished 17th in the junior all-around division.  She competed at the Island Games, helping the Isle of Man finish first in the team floor and vault competition and individually won bronze on floor exercise.  She next competed at the Northern European Championships where she helped the Isle of Man finish eighth as a team and individually she placed fifth on vault.

2014 
Donnelly competed at the Welsh, English, and British championships early in the year.  She was selected to represent the Isle of Man at the 2014 Commonwealth Games.  While there she helped Isle of Man finish 10th as a team.

2015 
In 2015 Donnelly began representing Ireland in international competition.  She made her debut for Ireland at the European Championships.  Additionally she competed at the European Games and the World Championships, representing Ireland, and at the Northern European Championships representing the Isle of Man.

2017 
Donnelly competed at the English Championships and the Irish Championships, winning silver in the all-around at the latter.  In June she competed at the Island Games where she dominated the competition.  She helped Isle of Man finish first in the team floor and vault event and individually she won gold in the all-around, vault, balance beam, and floor exercise and silver on uneven bars.  She competed at the Northern European Championships, representing Ireland.  She helped the team finish seventh.

2018 
Donnelly competed at the Irish Championships in early 2018.  She was slated to compete at the 2018 Commonwealth Games as part of the Manx delegation; however she was unable to do so due to representing Ireland opposed to Great Britain in international competition.

2021 
Due to the global COVID-19 pandemic and no longer representing Ireland in international competition, Donnelly did not compete again until 2021.  In early 2021 her nationality change officially went through and her FIG license was officially updated to Great Britain.  In November Donnelly competed at the Malta International where she placed first in the all-around and on vault, balance beam, and floor exercise.  She won bronze on the uneven bars behind Ella Borg of Malta and fellow Manx gymnast Lucy Worthington.  Donnelly next competed at the Northern European Championships.  While there she helped Isle of Man finish sixth as a team and individually she finished first on floor exercise, fourth in the all-around, sixth on balance beam, and seventh on vault.

2022 
In early 2022 Donnelly competed at the Scottish, English, and British Championships.  Due to her results at these various championships she was chosen to represent the Isle of Man at the 2022 Commonwealth Games.  While there she qualified to the all-around final where she finished 13th.

Competitive history

References

External links
 

1998 births
Living people
British female artistic gymnasts
Irish female artistic gymnasts
Manx sportswomen
Manx artistic gymnasts
Commonwealth Games competitors for the Isle of Man
Gymnasts at the 2014 Commonwealth Games
Gymnasts at the 2022 Commonwealth Games
Gymnasts at the 2015 European Games